Melville Peak is a prominent peak surmounting Cape Melville, the eastern cape of King George Island, in the South Shetland Islands off Antarctica. It represents an eroded stratovolcano of unknown age and contains a volcanic crater at its summit.

This peak, which was probably known to early sealers in the area, was charted by the French Antarctic Expedition under Jean-Baptiste Charcot, 1908–10, and takes its name from Cape Melville. It was climbed from the northeast in September 1949 by Geoff Hattersley-Smith and Ken Pawson.

See also
 List of volcanoes in Antarctica

References

Mountains of King George Island (South Shetland Islands)
Volcanoes of the South Shetland Islands
Stratovolcanoes